Star 69 refers to "last-call return," the Calling Feature Vertical service code *69 keyed on a landline telephone set in order to return the call of the last one to ring (in Canada and the United States).

Star 69 may also refer to:

Star 69 (band), an English rock band (1995–1997)
*69 (album), a 2018 studio album by Emily Blue
"Star 69" (R.E.M. song), a 1994 song by R.E.M. from their album Monster
"Star 69" (Fatboy Slim song), a 2001 single by Fatboy Slim from his album Halfway Between the Gutter and the Stars
"Starsixtynine", a 1994 song by Lifetime from their album Seven Inches
"*69", a 1995 song by Christine Lavin from her album Please Don't Make Me Too Happy